Ghent is a surname. Notable people with the surname include:

Emma Ghent Curtis (1860–1918), American novelist, poet, newspaper publisher, Populist, and suffragist
Emmanuel Ghent (1925–2003), Canadian composer and psychoanalyst
Matthew Ghent (born 1980), English footballer 
Ronnie Ghent (born 1980), American footballer 
W. J. Ghent (1866–1942), American writer